The 1949 South American Championship Final was the final match to determine the winner of the 1949 South American Championship, the 21st. edition of this continental competition. It was held on May 11, 1949, in Estádio São Januário of Rio de Janeiro. Brazil hosted the tournament after 27 years.

Brazil had won all its previous matches, thrashing their rivals in all of them (totalising 36 goals in 5 games). Nevertheless, the 2–1 loss to Paraguay caused both teams tied on points so a final match had to be played to crown a champion. 

On the other hand, the Paraguay side had a strong team with such notable players, regarded by some journalists as the best of its history. In fact, the Paraguayan side achieved some notable results such as the 2nd place in the previous edition.

Brazil won the match against Paraguay, thrashing them by 7–0 and winning its 3rd. continental title.

Qualified teams

Route to the final 

Notes
 Brazil and Paraguay finished tied on points so a playoff match had to be played to decide the champion.

Match details

References

1949 in Brazilian football
1949 in Paraguayan football
Paraguay national football team matches
Brazil national football team matches
Copa América finals
International sports competitions in Rio de Janeiro (city)
May 1949 sports events in South America
20th century in Rio de Janeiro